Fungus Rock, sometimes known as Mushroom Rock, and among the Maltese as Il-Ġebla tal-Ġeneral, is a small islet in the form of a  massive lump of limestone at the entrance to an almost circular black lagoon in Dwejra, on the coast of Gozo, itself an island in the Maltese archipelago.

History 
The Knights Hospitaller apparently discovered what is popularly known as the Maltese fungus growing on the rock's flat top. This plant, which is a kind of parasitic flowering plant, not a fungus, has a repulsive smell. Doctors at the time believed that it had medicinal properties. The Knights used it as a styptic dressing for wounds and a cure for dysentery. They so prized it that they often gave gifts of it to distinguished noblemen and visitors to the Maltese islands.

Grand Master Pinto decreed the Rock out of bounds in 1746; trespassers risked a three-year spell as oarsmen in the Knights' galleys. He also ordered the sides smoothed to remove handholds.

Pinto's efforts were perhaps unnecessary. Pharmacologists are studying the medical effects of Fucus coccineus melitensis today. 

Today, Fungus Rock is a nature reserve. However, the shoreline nearby is accessible to bathers and the sea provides perfect snorkeling.

The sunset can be photographed through the opening in Fungus Rock, but only from the inlet anchorage, and only during seasons when the sun descends the right way.

Notes

External links

 
Rock formations of Malta
Islands of Malta
Uninhabited islands of Malta
San Lawrenz